Meall a' Ghiubhais (887 m) is a mountain in the Northwest Highlands, Scotland. It lies in Wester Ross, close to the village of Kinlochewe.

The mountain is a steep, rugged peak, with a straightforward if pathless, unmarked climb to its summit from the Beinn Eighe Nature Reserve circular path. From the top, the views are spectacular, with Beinn Eighe and Slioch across Loch Maree prominent landmarks.

References

Mountains and hills of the Northwest Highlands
Marilyns of Scotland
Corbetts